Caitlin Campbell (born 2 February 1991) is a New Zealand association football player who represented her country.

She was a member of the New Zealand squad in the inaugural FIFA U-17 Women's World Cup, playing 2 group games; a 0–1 loss to Canada, and a 1–2 loss to Denmark.

Campbell also represented New Zealand at the 2008 FIFA U-20 Women's World Cup in Chile, playing all 3 group games; a 2–3 loss to Nigeria, a 4–3 win over hosts Chile, and a 1–1 draw with England.

Campbell made her senior Football Ferns début in a 0–3 loss to China on 14 November 2006.

References

External links

1991 births
Living people
New Zealand women's international footballers
New Zealand women's association footballers
Cricketers from Hastings, New Zealand
People educated at Massey High School
Women's association football midfielders